Entombment of Christ is a c.1595 oil on copper painting by Annibale Carracci, now in the Metropolitan Museum of Art

According to Giovanni Pietro Bellori and Carlo Cesare Malvasia, Annibale Carracci's main 17th-century biographers, the painting was produced for Astorre Sampieri, an important clergyman in Bologna. Malvasia adds the details that it was a painting on copper and that Sampieri commissioned it to give to a major but unnamed figure in Rome but thought so highly of it that he kept the original for itself and instead gave the figure a (now lost) copy made by Carracci's then pupil Guido Reni. It is usually dated to around 1595, the year in which Annibale, his cousin Ludovico and his brother Agostino completed the Palazzo Sampieri frescoes for Sampieri, complemented by Annibale's own Christ and the Samaritan Woman.

Several copies of the work survive, particularly by Sisto Badalocchio, leading scholars to theorise that there must be a lost original of the composition by Carracci himself. The work reappeared on the art market and was acquired by the Metropolitan Museum in 1998 as another Badalocchio copy, only later being reattributed to Carracci himself.

Gallery

References

paintings by Annibale Carracci
Paintings in the collection of the Metropolitan Museum of Art
Carracci
1595 paintings